There was no All-Ireland Senior Football Championship Final in 1925. The 1925 All-Ireland Senior Football Championship ended in chaos, with first Mayo, and then Galway being proclaimed champions after Kerry and Cavan were disqualified. Instead, a new inter-provincial tournament was organised by the GAA Central Council, of which the final was played between Galway and Cavan on 10 January 1926.

Galway were under pressure to cement their All-Ireland title, and soothe the dissatisfaction over the manner of their claiming it.

Match summary
Galway won the match by two clear goals, 3–2 to 1–2. It was their first ever All-Ireland football title, and it followed two previous losing appearances in the final (a loss to Kildare in 1919 and a loss to Dublin in 1922). The GAA lists this match as the 1925 All-Ireland Final on their website, though it was the final of a distinct and separate tournament.

References

All-Ireland Senior Football Championship Final
All-Ireland Senior Football Championship Final, 1925
All-Ireland Senior Football Championship Finals
Cavan county football team matches
Galway county football team matches